Sarah Ruhl (born January 24, 1974) is an American playwright, professor, and essayist. Among her most popular plays are Eurydice (2003), The Clean House (2004), and In the Next Room (or the Vibrator Play) (2009). She has been the recipient of a MacArthur Fellowship and the PEN/Laura Pels International Foundation for Theater Award for a distinguished American playwright in mid-career. Two of her plays have been finalists for the Pulitzer Prize for Drama and she received a nomination for Tony Award for Best Play. In 2020, she adapted her play Eurydice into the libretto for Matthew Aucoin's opera of the same name. Eurydice was nominated for Best Opera Recording at the 2023 Grammy Awards.

In 2015, she published a collection of essays, 100 Essays I Don't Have Time to Write. Her most recent play, Becky Nurse of Salem (2019) premiered at Berkeley Repertory Theatre. She currently serves on the faculty of the Yale School of Drama. In 2018, Letters from Max: A Book of Friendship, co-authored by Max Ritvo, was published by Milkweed Editions. Her memoir Smile was listed as one of Time magazine's 100 Must-Read Books of 2021.

Biography

Early life
Ruhl was born in Wilmette, Illinois. Her mother, Kathleen Ruhl, studied theater at Smith College and earned a Ph.D. in Language, Literacy, and Rhetoric from the University of Illinois and became an English teacher, as well as an actress and a theatre director.  Her father, Patrick Ruhl, became a marketer of toys, with an appreciation for literature and music. Her older sister, Kate, is a psychiatrist.

Beginning in the fourth grade, Ruhl received dramatic training at the Piven Theatre Workshop, in Evanston, Illinois. On the occasion of a 2015 production at Piven of her Melancholy Play, Ruhl credited the institution with teaching her about the role of language and narration in theater. Ruhl attended Interlochen Arts Camp for several summers in her youth.

Ruhl had intended to become a poet, but after she studied under Paula Vogel at Brown University, she was persuaded to switch to playwriting. Her first play was The Dog Play, written in 1995 for one of Vogel's classes. At Brown University she earned a Bachelor of Arts in English (1997) and Master of Fine Arts in Playwriting (2001). She also spent a year of graduate work studying English literature at Pembroke College, Oxford.

Career

Playwriting
Orlando, an adaptation of the novel by Virginia Woolf, was commissioned by the Piven Theatre Workshop and premiered in Evanston, Illinois in May 1998 featuring Justine Scarpa as Orlando. Director Joyce Piven later helmed the show again in March 2003 at The Actors' Gang, Hollywood, California, with Polly Noonan taking on the title role. The play was produced Off-Broadway by the Classic Stage Company in 2010. In 2015, Orlando premiered for the Sydney Theatre Company at the Sydney Opera House with actress Jacqueline McKenzie playing the lead.

The Lady with the Lap Dog, and Anna Around the Neck (adapted from Anton Chekhov) were commissioned and produced by the Piven Theatre Workshop in 2001. The two plays are Ruhl's stage adaptions of Anton Chekov short stories.

Late: A Cowboy Song was produced by Clubbed Thumb (New York City)  in 2003.

The Cornerstone Theater Company (Los Angeles) commissioned Ruhl for a play about young people living in Los Angeles. Cornerstone presented the play, Demeter in the City at REDCAT in June 2006. The play is based on the myth of Demeter and Persephone.

The Oldest Boy premiered in November 2014 at the Lincoln Center for the Performing Arts Mitzi E. Newhouse Theater. The play was directed by Rebecca Taichman and starred Celia Keenan-Bolger and James Yaegashi.

Her play Scenes from Court Life, or The Whipping Boy and His Prince premiered at Yale Repertory Theatre on October 1, 2016 in previews, officially on October 6, and ran to October 22, 2016. The play, directed by Mark Wing-Davey, involves "privilege and politics in both 17th century Britain and current day America." The play was presented by the graduate acting class at the Tisch School of the Arts at New York University in November 2015.

Her play How to Transcend a Happy Marriage premiered Off-Broadway at Lincoln Center's Mitzi E. Newhouse Theater on February 23, 2017 in previews, officially on March 20, 2017, directed by Rebecca Taichman. The cast featured Lena Hall, Marisa Tomei, Brian Hutchison, David McElwee, Naian González Norvind, Omar Metwally, Austin Smith, and Robin Weigert. The play, which takes place in New Jersey, involves two married couples.

For Peter Pan on her 70th birthday premiered Off-Broadway at Playwrights Horizon on August 18, 2017 (previews), directed by Les Waters and featuring Kathleen Chalfant and Lisa Emery. The play had its debut at Berkeley Repertory Theatre in May 2016 and then with the Shattered Globe Theatre at Theater Wit in Chicago in May 2017, starring Ruhl's mother Kathleen Ruhl.

Becky Nurse of Salem premiered at Berkeley Repertory Theatre on December 19, 2019, directed by Anne Kauffman and featured Pamela Reed as the title character.

She is an active member of New Dramatists, a development space for new playwrights that is in partnership with the NYU Tisch Graduate Acting Program.

The Clean House

Ruhl gained widespread recognition for her play The Clean House (2004). "The play takes place in a 'metaphysical Connecticut' where married doctors employ a Brazilian housekeeper who is more interested in coming up with the perfect joke than in cleaning.  Trouble erupts when the husband falls in love with one of his cancer patients". It won the Susan Smith Blackburn Prize in 2004 and was a Pulitzer Prize finalist in 2005.

Eurydice 

Eurydice (2004) was produced Off-Broadway at the Second Stage Theatre in June to July 2007. Prior to that it had been staged at Yale Rep (2006), Berkeley Rep (2004), Georgetown University, and Circle X Theatre. She wrote Eurydice in honor of her father, who died in 1994 of cancer, and as a way to "have a few more conversations with him."  The play explores the use and understanding of language, an interest which she shared with her father:

Each Saturday, from the time Ruhl was five, Patrick took his daughters to the Walker Brothers Original Pancake House for breakfast and taught them a new word, along with its etymology.  (The language lesson and some of Patrick's words—"ostracize," "peripatetic," "defunct"—are memorialized in the 2003 Eurydice, a retelling of the Orpheus myth from his inamorata's point of view, in which the dead Father, reunited with his daughter, tries to re-teach her lost vocabulary.)

Eurydice is Ruhl's version of the classic Eurydice and Orpheus tale. It portrays an Alice in Wonderland-esque underworld, complete with talking stones and a Lord of the Underworld, who can be seen riding a red tricycle. In keeping with the play's Greek origins, the Stones serve as a new take on a Greek chorus. The Stones comment on the action and warn the characters, but cannot intervene in any of the events.  The play explores relationships, love, communication, and the permeability between the world of the living and the world of the dead, in a quest to discover where true meaning lies in life and thereafter.

In 2020, Ruhl adapted the play as a libretto for a new opera composed by Matthew Aucoin. It premiered at the Los Angeles Opera on February 1, 2020. and at the Metropolitan Opera on November 23, 2021.

Passion Play
Ruhl's Passion Play cycle premiered at the Arena Stage, Washington, D.C. in 2005, directed by Molly Smith. It was next produced by the Goodman Theatre (Chicago) and Yale Rep (New Haven). Ruhl began writing Passion Play at age 21, while studying with Paula Vogel at Brown University. She did not finish the play until eight years later, after Wendy C. Goldberg and Arena's Molly Smith commissioned the third act. Passion Play made its New York City premiere in Spring 2010 in a production by the Epic Theatre Ensemble at the Irondale Center in Brooklyn. Each part of the trilogy depicts the staging of a Passion Play at a different place and during a different historical period: Elizabethan England, Nazi Germany, and the United States from the time of the Vietnam War until the present.

Dead Man's Cell Phone

Dead Man's Cell Phone (2007) premiered Off-Broadway at Playwrights Horizons in 2008 starring Mary-Louise Parker. Its world premiere was at Washington D.C.'s Woolly Mammoth Theatre Company in 2007. It was subsequently produced by the Steppenwolf Theatre in 2008 and at the Oregon Shakespeare Festival in 2009. The play received a UK premiere at The Arches (Glasgow) in June 2011.  The play explores technology and the disconnect people are experiencing in the digital age:

"Cell phones, iPods, wireless computers will change people in ways we don't even understand," Ruhl stated. "We're less connected to the present. No one is where they are. There's absolutely no reason to talk to a stranger anymore—you connect to people you already know. But how well do you know them? Because you never see them—you just talk to them. I find that terrifying."

In the Next Room

In the Next Room (or The Vibrator Play) premiered at Berkeley Rep in February 2009. The play opened on Broadway at the Lyceum Theatre with previews starting on October 22, 2009 and an official opening in November 2009. This marked Ruhl's Broadway debut. The play explores the history of the vibrator, developed for use as a treatment for women diagnosed with hysteria. In the Next Room was a finalist for the 2010 Pulitzer Prize for Drama and was nominated for the 2010 Tony Award for Best Play, Best Featured Actress, and Best Costume.

Ruhl explains,

One physician quoted in the book [The Technology of the Orgasm] argued that at least three-fourths of women had ailments that could be cured by the vibrator. Which is kind of stunning. The economy for vibrators, even then, was vast; I mean, it was a million-dollar enterprise.

The play then moved to Sydney, Australia and premiered for the Sydney Theatre Company with Jacqueline McKenzie in the title role. The production was directed by Pamela Rabe.

Themes and style
In September 2006, she received a MacArthur Fellowship. The announcement of that award stated: "Sarah Ruhl, 32, playwright, New York City. Playwright creating vivid and adventurous theatrical works that poignantly juxtapose the mundane aspects of daily life with mythic themes of love and war."

John Lahr, in The New Yorker, wrote of Ruhl:

But if Ruhl's demeanor is unassuming, her plays are bold. Her nonlinear form of realism—full of astonishments, surprises, and mysteries—is low on exposition and psychology. "I try to interpret how people subjectively experience life," she has said. "Everyone has a great, horrible opera inside him. I feel that my plays, in a way, are very old-fashioned. They're pre-Freudian in the sense that the Greeks and Shakespeare worked with similar assumptions. Catharsis isn't a wound being excavated from childhood."

In a discussion with Paula Vogel for BOMB Magazine, Ruhl described the psychology of her plays as "putting things up against Freud ... it's a more medieval sensibility of the humors, melancholia, black bile, and transformation." Rather than "connect the dots psychologically in a linear way," Ruhl prefers to create emotional psychological states through transformation of the performance space.

Personal life
In 2005, Ruhl married child psychiatrist Tony Charuvastra. He taught a course at NYU on marriage and divorce and sometimes included In the Next Room on his syllabus. Ruhl and Charuvastra have three children: Anna and twins William and Hope.

Awards, nominations and honors
Ruhl was awarded the Residency 1 program by the Signature Theatre Company in 2019. This involves "a year-long intensive, exploration of a writer's body of work."

In 2006, Ruhl received a MacArthur Foundation Fellowship with a cash award of $500,000. Ruhl commented: "...the money is truly astounding. The whole thing really does leave one speechless."

Ruhl has been awarded the Steinberg Distinguished  Playwright Award for 2016; the awardee is given a cash award of $200,000. The Steinberg committee said, in part: "Her work sparks conversation in audiences of all ages with its emotionally vivid language [...] Sarah Ruhl is unique. She fills her intelligent and highly theatrical plays with striking oddities and playful humor. Sarah is a prolific playwright of great distinction.

 2003 Whiting Award
 2004 Susan Smith Blackburn Prize for The Clean House
 2005 Pulitzer Prize, Finalist for The Clean House
 2006 MacArthur Fellowship
 2008 Helen Hayes Award for Dead Man's Cell Phone
 2008 PEN/Laura Pels International Foundation for Theater Award
 2010 Lilly Award
 2010 Tony Award, Nomination for Best Play for In the Next Room (or The Vibrator Play)
 2010 Pulitzer Prize, Finalist for In the Next Room (or The Vibrator Play)
 2016 Samuel French Award, for Sustained Excellence in American Theatre.

Plays
Original plays 
Melancholy Play (2001)
Virtual Meditations#1 (2002)
Passion Play (2003 and 2004)
Eurydice (2003)
Late: A Cowboy Song (2003)
The Clean House (2004)
Demeter in the City (2006)
Dead Man's Cell Phone (2007)
In the Next Room (or The Vibrator Play) (2009)
Stage Kiss (2011)
Two Conversations Overheard on Airplanes [short] (2013)
The Oldest Boy (2014)
Scenes from Court Life, or The Whipping Boy and His Prince (2016)
How to Transcend a Happy Marriage (2017)
For Peter Pan on her 70th Birthday (2017)
Becky Nurse of Salem (2019)
Letters From Max (2023)

Adaptations
 Lady with the Lap Dog, and Anna around the Neck (adapted from Anton Chekhov) (2001)
Orlando (adapted from Virginia Woolf) (2003)
 Three Sisters (adapted from Anton Chekhov, Yale Repertory Theatre, 2011)
Dear Elizabeth (2012) - (Adapted from Words in Air: The Complete Correspondence Between Robert Lowell and Elizabeth Bishop)

Other works 

 Letters from Max: A Book of Friendship, (co-authored with Max Ritvo), Milkweed Editions (2018)
 Eurydice (libretto), opera, (composer, Matthew Aucoin), (2019)
 44 Poems for You, Copper Canyon Press, (2020)
Smile: The Story of a Face, Simon & Schuster, (2021)

References

External links

Profile and Production History at The Whiting Foundation
Sarah Ruhl at Pen American Center
Beyond Electricity, Toward Female Emancipation, New York Times - review of In the Next Room
Sarah Ruhl Papers. Yale Collection of American Literature, Beinecke Rare Book and Manuscript Library.
Sarah Ruhl performs onstage at Joe's Pub for House of SpeakEasy's "Seriously Entertaining" Cabaret

1974 births
21st-century American dramatists and playwrights
21st-century American women writers
Alumni of Pembroke College, Oxford
American opera librettists
American women dramatists and playwrights
Brown University alumni
Living people
MacArthur Fellows
People from Wilmette, Illinois
Wesleyan University people
Women opera librettists
Writers from Illinois